Kid Nightingale is a 1939 American musical comedy film directed by George Amy and written by Charles Belden and Raymond L. Schrock. The film stars John Payne, Jane Wyman, Walter Catlett, Edward Brophy, Charles D. Brown, Max Hoffman Jr., and John Ridgely. The film was released by Warner Bros. on November 4, 1939.

Plot
Singing waiter Steve Nelson flattens a customer who heckles him. Skip Davis, a trainer of prizefighters, witnesses this and proposes a new career to Steve, who agrees on the condition voice coach Rudolfo Terrassi is hired to help train him as a singer as well.

Women flock to ringside to watch the handsome Steve, dubbed "Kid Nightingale" for his singing talents. Steve is unaware that Skip and promoter Charles Paxton have fixed a number of fights, planning to bet on Steve to lose when he is pitted against a genuine opponent.

Judy Craig, the fighter's fiancée, recognizes Terrassi to be an impostor, actually wrestler Strangler Colombo in disguise. She brings the real Terrassi to the ring, where Steve, realizing he has been hoodwinked, promptly knocks out his foe, ruining his trainer's scheme and quitting boxing for good.

Cast 
John Payne as Steve Nelson
Jane Wyman as Judy Craig
Walter Catlett as Skip Davis
Edward Brophy as Mike Jordon 
Charles D. Brown as Charles Paxton
Max Hoffman Jr. as Fitts 
John Ridgely as Whitey
Harry Burns as Strangler Colombo / Rudolfo Terrassi
William Haade as Rocky Snyder
Helen Troy as Marge
Winifred Harris as Mrs. Reynolds
Lee Phelps as Ring Announcer
Frankie Van as Frankie

References

External links

1939 films
Warner Bros. films
American musical comedy films
1939 musical comedy films
Films directed by George Amy
American black-and-white films
1930s English-language films
1930s American films